Diporiphora convergens, the Crystal Creek two-lined dragon, is a species of agama found in Australia.

References

Diporiphora
Agamid lizards of Australia
Taxa named by Glen Milton Storr
Reptiles described in 1974